Ostro was the name of at least two ships of the Italian Navy and may refer to:

 , a  launched in 1901 and discarded in 1920.
 , a  launched in 1928 and sunk in 1940.

Italian Navy ship names